Hanisha (or Haneesha) is a female given name of Arabic origin.

References

Given names